Henry Gabriel Sanchez (December 29, 1907 – March 13, 1978) was an Admiral in the United States Navy. During World War II, then-LCDR Sanchez commanded VF-72, an F4F squadron of 37 aircraft, on board the carrier Hornet from July to October 1942. His squadron was responsible for shooting down 38 Japanese airplanes during his command tour which included the Battle of the Santa Cruz Islands.

References 

1907 births
1978 deaths
United States Navy pilots of World War II
United States Navy officers